Fred Allen Jones Jr. (born October 18, 1977) is a former American football linebacker who played four seasons in the National Football League with the Buffalo Bills and Kansas City Chiefs. He played college football at the University of Colorado Boulder and attended St. Augustine High School in San Diego, California. He was also a member of the Frankfurt Galaxy of NFL Europe.

References

External links
Just Sports Stats
Career transactions

Players of American football from San Diego
American football linebackers
African-American players of American football
Colorado Buffaloes football players
Buffalo Bills players
Frankfurt Galaxy players
Kansas City Chiefs players
Living people
1977 births
21st-century African-American sportspeople
20th-century African-American sportspeople